Qanat Qazi (also Romanized as Qanāt Qāẕī and Qanāt-e Qāzī' also known as Ghal’eh Ghazi, Kahn-e Ghāzī, Kaleh Kūzi, Qal‘eh-i-Qāzi, and Qal‘eh-ye Qāzī) is a village in Dehsard Rural District, in the Central District of Arzuiyeh County, Kerman Province, Iran. At the 2006 census, its population was 18, in 4 families.

References 

Populated places in Arzuiyeh County